Type 67 may refer to:

 Type 67 mortar, mortar, China, introduced 1967
 Type 67 machine gun, China, introduced 1967
 Type 67 (silenced pistol), semi-automatic silenced pistol, China, introduced 1968